The 6th Australian Academy of Cinema and Television Arts Awards (generally known as AACTA Awards) are a series of awards which includes the 6th AACTA Awards Luncheon, the 6th AACTA Awards ceremony and the 6th AACTA International Awards. The former two events were held at The Star Event Centre, in Sydney, New South Wales. Presented by the Australian Academy of Cinema and Television Arts (AACTA), the awards celebrate the best in Australian feature film, television, documentary and short film productions of 2016. The first winners announced on 5 December 2016 and the AACTA Awards ceremony occurred on 7 December 2016 and was broadcast on the Seven Network for the second year running with an extended broadcast to air on Arena.

The first round of nominees, for Best Feature Length Documentary,  Best Short Animation and Best Short Fiction Film, were announced on 14 July 2016. A new feature film and television category for Best Hair and Makeup was presented for the first time. Through a partnership with Australian Subscription Television and Radio Association (ASTRA) five additional awards, for subscription television programs, were handed out for Best Lifestyle Program, Best New Talent, Best Male Presenter, Best Female Presenter and Best Live Event Production.

Nominees
The nominations are as follows:

Feature film

Television

Documentary

Short film

Other awards

Special awards

Longford Lyell Award - Paul Hogan, for his work as an  actor, producer and writer.
Trailblazer Award - Isla Fisher, for her work as an actress.
Byron Kennedy Award - Lynette Wallworth, for her work as a filmmaker and her use of virtual reality and the mixing of technology with art.

Productions with multiple nominations

Feature film

Twelve: Hacksaw Ridge
Ten: The Daughter
Seven: Girl Asleep
Six: Pawno
Five: Goldstone, Tanna, Gods of Egypt
Two: Down Under, Spear

References

External links
 The Australian Academy of Cinema and Television Arts official website
 Official broadcast website at Yahoo7

AACTA Awards ceremonies
AACTA Awards
AACTA Awards
AACTA Awards